The Two-man competition at the IBSF World Championships 2023 was held on 28 and 29 January 2023.

Results
The first two runs were started on 28 January at 13:00 and the last two runs on 29 January at 13:15.

References

Two-man